David Holland (1 September 1887 – 7 March 1945) was an English dual-code international rugby union, and professional rugby league footballer who played in the 1910s and 1920s.

Playing career

International honours
Dave Holland won caps for England (RU) while at Gloucester in 1912 against Wales, Ireland, and Scotland, and won caps for Great Britain while at Oldham in 1914 against Australia (3 matches), and New Zealand.

Club career
In 1913, both Billy Hall, and Dave Holland left Gloucester RFC to join Oldham, following Alf Wood who had made the same journey in 1908. Alf Wood and Dave Holland both played at Oldham until 1921, and Billy Hall played there until 1925. All three men played in Great Britain's "Rorke's Drift" Test match against Australia in 1914, with Alf Wood kicking the four goals that would be the difference in the end.

References

External links
!Great Britain Statistics at englandrl.co.uk (statistics currently missing due to not having appeared for both Great Britain, and England)
Statistics at scrum.com
Statistics at orl-heritagetrust.org.uk
The Legend of Rorke's Drift by Harold Wagstaff - Captain 1914 Lions = from the "Sports Post" - Yorkshire - 4 May 1935

1887 births
1945 deaths
Dual-code rugby internationals
England international rugby union players
English rugby league players
English rugby union players
Gloucester Rugby players
Great Britain national rugby league team players
Oldham R.L.F.C. players
Rugby league locks
Rugby league props
Rugby league players from Gloucestershire
Rugby league second-rows
Rugby union forwards
Rugby union players from Gloucester